Nancy Uranga Ramagoza (17 August 1954 – 6 October 1976) was a Cuban fencer. She competed in the women's individual and team foil events at the 1976 Summer Olympics. She was one of the passengers on board Cubana Flight 455, which was destroyed by a bomb set by Cuban exiles, killing everyone aboard.

References

1954 births
1976 deaths
Cuban female foil fencers
Olympic fencers of Cuba
Fencers at the 1976 Summer Olympics
People murdered in Barbados
Cuban people murdered abroad
Cuban terrorism victims
Victims of aviation accidents or incidents in Barbados
Pan American Games medalists in fencing
Pan American Games gold medalists for Cuba
Fencers at the 1975 Pan American Games
Victims of aviation accidents or incidents in 1976
People from Bahía Honda, Cuba
20th-century Cuban women